Die Hard 2 (also known by its tagline Die Harder or Die Hard 2: Die Harder) is a 1990 American action-thriller film and the second installment in the Die Hard film series. The film was released on July 4, 1990, in the United States. The film was directed by Renny Harlin, and written by Steven E. de Souza and Doug Richardson. It stars Bruce Willis as John McClane. The film co-stars Bonnie Bedelia, William Sadler, Art Evans, William Atherton, Franco Nero, Dennis Franz, Fred Thompson, John Amos, and Reginald VelJohnson.

As with the first film, the action in Die Hard 2 takes place on Christmas Eve. McClane is waiting for his wife to land at Washington Dulles International Airport when terrorists take over the air traffic control system. He must stop the terrorists before his wife's plane and several other incoming flights that are circling the airport run out of fuel and crash. During the night, McClane must also contend with airport police and a military commander, none of whom want his assistance.

The film was released to generally positive reviews with critics praising the films action and tone while criticizing plot issues. Die Hard 2 was a major box office success grossing 240 million dollars, doubling the earnings of its predecessor and finishing as the year's 7th highest grossing film.

The film was preceded by Die Hard (1988) and followed by Die Hard with a Vengeance (1995), Live Free or Die Hard (2007), and A Good Day to Die Hard (2013).

Plot
On Christmas Eve, two years after the events of the previous film, John McClane is now a lieutenant with the L.A.P.D, who arrives at Dulles International Airport to pick up his wife, Holly. Meanwhile, a plane carrying corrupt foreign military leader General Ramon Esperanza is also headed to Dulles under extradition for using U.S. funds to buy drugs. Waiting to meet Esperanza's plane is disgraced former Colonel William Stuart and a group of ex-military sympathizers who supported Esperanza's actions. Suspicious, McClane follows two of Stuart's men into a restricted baggage sorting area where a gun fight ensues. McClane kills one man, but the other escapes.

With the help of his friend, Sergeant Al Powell, he discovers that the dead man's fingerprints correspond to an American soldier who died in a helicopter accident two years ago. Putting this together with Esperanza's imminent arrival, McClane reports his concerns to the airport police chief, Carmine Lorenzo, and air traffic control director Ed Trudeau, but neither believe him. They are convinced when Stuart and his men, operating out of a church on the outskirts of the airport, cut all communications with incoming airplanes, disable all runway lighting, and demand that Esperanza's plane be allowed to land without interference. Under Stuart's direction, Trudeau orders all air traffic controllers to have all planes in Dulles airspace hold in the air despite their low fuel warnings. 

McClane becomes worried about Holly's plane and enlists the help of the airport janitor Marvin to fight back. Chief airport engineer Leslie Barnes decides to try using an unfinished antenna array to communicate with the stranded circling airplanes. Carmine sends an airport SWAT team with him, but Stuart's men kill them all and destroy the antenna. Barnes is saved by McClane.  In retaliation, Stuart crashes a British airplane killing everyone onboard by impersonating air traffic control and faking the airplane's altimeter reading. Once Esperanza's plane lands, McClane wounds Esperanza before Stuart and his men arrive. They blow up the plane and take Esperanza to the church, but fail to kill McClane. A U.S. Special Forces team arrives, led by Major Grant, for whom Stuart is a protégé. 

Grant's men and McClane attack the church. McClane kills one of Stuart's men and gives chase with his gun, but the mercenaries escape on snowmobiles. Confused as to why he failed to wound anyone, McClane realizes the gun was filled with blanks, meaning the firefight was staged and Grant's team are secretly cooperating with Stuart. Grant, Stuart, their men, and Esperanza all rendezvous at an airport hangar, where a Boeing 747 that they demanded is waiting for them. On Holly's flight, arrogant reporter Richard Thornburg becomes suspicious as to why the plane hasn't landed. He taps into the cockpit communications and records an earlier surreptitious transmission from Barnes to all the circling airplanes describing the situation. In the airplane's lavatory, he broadcasts the recording live on television, leading to a panic in the airport terminal which prevents McClane and Carmine from getting to the 747. Holly subdues Thornburg with a fellow passenger's stun gun.

McClane asks a news crew to fly him via helicopter to intercept the 747. McClane jumps onto the wing and uses his coat to jam the aileron, preventing the plane from taking off. McClane kills Grant, and then opens the fuel valve in the wing during a struggle with Stuart. After Stuart kicks McClane off the wing, McClane uses a cigarette lighter to ignite the fuel trail, exploding the plane and killing everyone on board. The fire trail also serves as a landing guide for all airborne aircraft, including Holly's, to land safely. After McClane and Holly are reunited, Marvin picks them up in his airport cart and drives them away.

Cast

Additional cast members include Stuart's henchmen: Don Harvey as Garber, John Costelloe as Sergeant Oswald Cochrane, Vondie Curtis-Hall as Miller, John Leguizamo as Burke, Robert Patrick as O'Reilly, Tom Verica as Kahn, Tony Ganios as Baker, Michael Cunningham as Sheldon, Peter Nelson as Thompson, Ken Baldwin as Mulkey, and Mark Boone Junior as Shockley. Patrick O'Neal appears as Telford, Major Grant's radio operator.

Production

Development and writing
The screenplay was adapted from Walter Wager's 1987 novel 58 Minutes. The novel has the same plot but differs slightly: a police officer must stop terrorists who take an airport hostage while his daughter's plane circles overhead, and has 58 minutes to do so before the plane crashes. Roderick Thorp, who wrote the 1979 novel Nothing Lasts Forever, upon which Die Hard was based, receives credit for creating "certain original characters", although his name is misspelled onscreen as "Roderick Thorpe".

One of the writers of the screenplay, Steven E. de Souza, later admitted in an interview for the book Action Speaks Louder: Violence, Spectacle, and the American Action Movie that the villains were based on America's "Central American" meddling, primarily the Iran–Contra affair.

The film was originally budgeted at $40 million. Bruce Willis was paid $7.5 million for reprising his role for the film. Producer Joel Silver was accused of profligate spending and it was claimed the film cost $62–70 million. Fox domestic distribution president Tom Sherak dismissed the $70 million claim as "absurd". It was reported at the end of filming that Silver had been relieved of day-to-day producing duties.

Scenes of Dulles airport in the snow were to be filmed in Denver but filming was scrapped due to warm weather. Some outdoor scenes were filmed in Alpena, Michigan, while others needing to accommodate the landing of the 747 with snow were filmed at former Kincheloe Air Force Base in Kincheloe, Michigan. Other scenes were filmed on a sound stage in Los Angeles using fake snow.

Die Hard 2 was the first film to use digitally composited live-action footage with a traditional matte painting that had been photographed and scanned into a computer. It was used for the last scene, which took place on a runway.

According to Franco Nero, Silver got the idea to cast him after he saw movie posters of Nero hanging in the office of their mutual accountant. Nero did not want to do Die Hard 2 because he did not like the script and he had committed to do the film Breath of Life. Finally, Silver scheduled Nero's scenes in such a way that the actor could do both films.

Release

Marketing
In a trailer for the film screened during Christmas 1989, the film had a planned release date of June 29, 1990. This was brought forward to June 22; however, following claims of the film running over time and budget, the release date was pushed back two weeks to July 4.

Home media
The film debuted on video in the United States on January 31, 1991, and it was the most rented video in its first week above Navy SEALs and sold a record 505,000 units for rental.

The film became available on DVD on March 9, 1999, followed by a 2-Disc Special Edition DVD on July 10, 2001, as part of the Die Hard Ultimate Collection DVD and re-released again in early 2005 as a Widescreen Edition and June 19, 2007, followed by a Blu-ray release on November 20, 2007, and a re-release on January 29, 2013.

Reception

Box office
Die Hard 2 exceeded all expectations by outdoing the box office success of Die Hard. The film had the largest pre-opening, earning $3.7 million from 1,828 theaters. For six years, it would hold this record until it was surpassed by Independence Day in 1996. It had a wide release in 2,507 theaters in the United States and Canada, grossing $21.7 million its opening weekend. Die Hard 2 went on to gross $117.5 million in the United States and Canada, and $122.5 million internationally, earning over $240 million worldwide, almost doubling that of Die Hard. The film was re-released internationally in 1993 and made $216,339 more, which totaled its gross to $240.2 million.

Critical response
The site's critical consensus reads: "It lacks the fresh thrills of its predecessor, but Die Hard 2 still works as an over-the-top – and reasonably taut – big-budget sequel, with plenty of set pieces to paper over the plot deficiencies." On Metacritic, the film has a weighted average score of 67 out of 100, based on 17 critics, indicating "generally favorable reviews". Audiences polled by CinemaScore gave the film an average grade of "A" on an A+ to F scale.

Roger Ebert, who gave the original film a mixed review, described the sequel as "terrific entertainment", despite noting substantial credibility problems with the plot. Jay Boyar of the Orlando Sentinel dubbed the film as being as disappointing a sequel as Another 48 Hrs. and RoboCop 2, and said, Whatever small pleasure there is to be found in this loud dud is due mostly to the residual good feelings from the first film... As played by Bruce Willis, McClane is still an engaging character, even if he is much less amusingly drawn this time. Willis is in there trying, but the qualities that helped to make his character sympathetic in the first film are missing. McClane no longer worries openly about his personal safety, as he did in the original movie. His quasi-cowboy personality from Die Hard is all but forgotten – he has become more of a Rambo and less of a Roy Rogers. And though the filmmakers try to establish McClane as resistant to advanced technology, this promising idea isn't developed.Empire magazine rated the film three out of five stars, while stating, "It's entertaining nonsense that doesn't quite manage to recapture the magic of the original. Still, there are some nice moments here, and Willis is on solid ground as the iconic McClane."

Gene Siskel ranked the film as the sixth best movie of 1990. Maxim magazine ranked the film's plane crash #2 on its list of "Greatest Movie Plane Crashes".

Notes

References

External links

 
 
 
 
 

1990 films
1990 action thriller films
1990s Christmas films
20th Century Fox films
American action thriller films
American aviation films
American Christmas films
American sequel films
Die Hard
1990s English-language films
Films about aviation accidents or incidents
Films about hostage takings
Films about murderers
Films about terrorism in the United States
Films about United States Army Special Forces
Films based on American thriller novels
Films based on multiple works
Films directed by Renny Harlin
Films produced by Charles Gordon
Films produced by Lawrence Gordon
Films produced by Joel Silver
Films scored by Michael Kamen
Films set in 1990
Films set in airports
Films set in Virginia
Films set in Washington, D.C.
Films set on airplanes
Films shot in California
Films shot in Colorado
Films shot in Los Angeles
Films shot in Michigan
Films shot in Washington (state)
Films with screenplays by Steven E. de Souza
Silver Pictures films
1990s American films